Alyona Ivanivna Shkrum (born 2 January 1988) is a Ukrainian lawyer and politician. In 2014, she was elected to the Verkhovna Rada on the party list (placed 5th) of All-Ukrainian Union "Fatherland". Shkrum was re-elected for the same party (placed 22nd this time) in the 2019 Ukrainian parliamentary election.

Biography
Shkrum studied law at Taras Shevchenko National University of Kyiv, has an MA degree in law from the Paris 1 Panthéon-Sorbonne University and from Trinity Hall at University of Cambridge.

Before being elected People's Deputy of Ukraine Shkrum worked as a lawyer of (fellow) politician Iryna Herashchenko. and as advocacy expert of UNHCR implementing partner NGO.

In 2016, Shkrum won the Top 30 under 30 award by Kyiv Post.

In the 2019 Ukrainian parliamentary election Shkrum was again a candidate for Batkivshchyna ("Fatherland") while her husband Dmytro Natalukha was a candidate for the Servant of the People party. They were both elected into parliament.

References

1988 births
Living people
Lawyers from Kyiv
21st-century Ukrainian lawyers
Eighth convocation members of the Verkhovna Rada
Ninth convocation members of the Verkhovna Rada
All-Ukrainian Union "Fatherland" politicians
Alumni of Trinity Hall, Cambridge
University of Paris alumni
Pantheon-Sorbonne University alumni
Taras Shevchenko National University of Kyiv alumni
Ukrainian expatriates in France
Ukrainian women lawyers
21st-century Ukrainian women politicians
21st-century women lawyers
Politicians from Kyiv
Women members of the Verkhovna Rada